On Top of the World is a census-designated place (CDP) in southwestern Marion County, Florida, United States.

On Top of the World was first listed as a CDP for the 2020 census, when it had a population of 12,668.

Demographics

References 

Census-designated places in Marion County, Florida
Census-designated places in Florida